Carroll Ballard (born October 14, 1937) is a retired American film director. He has directed six feature films, including The Black Stallion (1979), Never Cry Wolf (1983), and Fly Away Home (1996).

Biography 
After serving in the United States Army, Ballard attended film school at UCLA, where one of his classmates was Francis Ford Coppola. He made a well received student film called Waiting for May in 1964.

His early credits include the documentaries Beyond This Winter's Wheat (1965) and Harvest (1967), which he made for the U.S. Information Agency. The latter was nominated for an Academy Award. He directed a short subject called The Perils of Priscilla (1969), which was filmed from the point of view of a cat who escapes from home. Rodeo (1970) provided an intimate look at the 1968 National Finals Rodeo in Oklahoma City. He shot the title sequence of Coppola's 1968 musical Finian's Rainbow and was second unit director on Star Wars (1977), for which he handled many of the outdoor desert scenes.

Ballard finally got the chance to make a feature film when Coppola offered him the job of directing The Black Stallion (1979), an adaptation of the children's book by Walter Farley. The film was nominated for two Academy Awards, including Best Supporting Actor (Mickey Rooney). In 2002 the Library of Congress added it to the National Film Registry.

He then directed Never Cry Wolf (1983), based on Farley Mowat's autobiographical book of the same name, which detailed Mowat's experiences with Arctic wolves.

In the 1990s, he made two films: Wind (1992) and Fly Away Home (1996).

His most recent film is Duma (2005), about a South African boy's friendship with an orphaned cheetah.

Ballard has received acclaim from film critics. Pauline Kael was an early admirer. Kenneth Turan once wrote: "[Ballard] knows how to be both caring and restrained, minimizing a movie's saccharine content while maximizing the sense of wonder."

Filmography 
The Black Stallion (1979)
Never Cry Wolf (1983)
Nutcracker: The Motion Picture (1986)
Wind (1992)
Fly Away Home (1996)
Duma (2005)

References

External links 
 

1937 births
American film directors
Living people
UCLA Film School alumni